Olympic Boulevard may refer to:

Olympic Boulevard (Los Angeles), a major arterial in Los Angeles
Olympic Boulevard (Melbourne), an inner city road in Melbourne, formerly part of Swan Street
 Olympic Blvd Expressway, an urban expressway in Seoul, South Korea